"Stronger Than That" is a song by English singer Cliff Richard, released in 1990 as the fourth single from his 1989 album Stronger. It reached the top twenty in the UK, peaking at No. 14 on the UK Singles Chart.

Track listing
7-inch vinyl and cassingle
"Stronger Than That" [Remix]
"Joanna"

7-inch vinyl and CD Single
"Stronger Than That" [Extended Version]
"Joanna"
"Stronger Than That" [Remix]

Chart performance

References

1989 songs
1990 singles
Cliff Richard songs
Songs written by Alan Tarney
Song recordings produced by Alan Tarney
EMI Records singles